Boorara Station most commonly known as Boorara is a pastoral lease that operates as a sheep and cattle station in south west Queensland.

Geography 

It is split into 23 paddocks and situated in the Paroo River catchment.

History 
The original lease was taken up by Alexander Hood, James Hood and James Torrance in the early 1800s and was run along with another property named Currawinya. By 1874 both of the properties had been sold to Hector and Norman Wilson who, in turn, sold it again in 1881 to Hew, Blackwood, Patterson and Company.

In 1894 approximately 140,000 sheep were being shorn at Boorara.

No bids were received and the property was passed in for private treaty.

The cattle baron, Sidney Kidman acquired the property in 1913 and sold it in 1924 to Edmund Jowett for about £20,000.

In 1927 a well borer struck a flow of  daily, Jowett decided to sink three more bores in an attempt to find more permanent water supply on the property. Jowett changed Boorara from a cattle run to a sheep run and then later sold it on in 1930 to William George McGrath when the property had a size of  who held it until his death on 4 August 1949 when it was passed onto his sons J. D. and A. McGrath.

The last of the owners of this proud station sold the property to the Queensland Government and Boorara is now part of the Currawinya National Park.

In September 2012 all the farm equipment was offered for sale.

See also
List of ranches and stations

References

Stations (Australian agriculture)
Pastoral leases in Queensland
South West Queensland